Rationalist Association of India (RAI) is an Indian rationalist organization that was established in 1930. Dr. D' Avoine was the President of the Rationalist Association of India (RAI) from 1938 to
1944. It is a full voting member of International Humanist and Ethical Union (IHEU), a global representative body of the humanist movement, uniting a diversity of non-religious organisations and individuals.

India's first blasphemy protection happened in 1933 when Dr. D'Avoine published an article titled "Religion and Morality" in the September 1933 issue of Reason, the official journal of RAI at that period. The Bombay Police confiscated all the copies of Reason and arrested Dr. D'Avoine and charged him under IPC 295A. On 5 March 1934, Sir H.P. Dastur, the Chief Presidency Magistrate of Bombay, dismissed the case by saying that "The accused may be wrong.... But the article merely represents the writer's view."

Current officials of RAI 
Chairman : Ravipudi Venkatadri 
Vice Chairman : Sreeni Pattathanam
President : Kura Hanumantha Rao
Vice President: Gumma Veeranna
Secretary : Meduri Sathyanarayana
Joint Secretary : Kannan Sivaram (founder of Nastik Nation, an online forum for atheism and free-thought)

See also
 Ravipudi Venkatadri
 Kotapati Murahari Rao
 Sreeni Pattathanam

References

External links 
 
 Nastik Nation Official Website 

Organizations established in 1930
Rationalist groups based in India
1930 establishments in India
Humanist associations